Verónica Alcocer García (born 26 May 1976) is the current First Lady of Colombia since 7 August 2022, as the wife of President Gustavo Petro.

She studied law but never completed the decision he made in order to give more visibility to his home, Alcocer has become a voice for the most vulnerable communities. Alcocer is the first wife of a president to have a leading role in the government on par with her husband.

Born in Sincelejo, Sucre, where she grew up and later would have a son from a first relationship, named Nicolas, she would later marry Gustavo Petro in 2000, becoming the stepmother of Andres, Nicolas and Andrea, two children from the first and second marriage of Gustavo Petro. Alcocer and her husband also have two daughters together, Sofía and Antonella about whom there is little information. She has been an ambassador clinging to culture and what the folklore of Colombian culture represents.

Early life
Verónica Alcocer García was born on 26 May 1976 in Sincelejo, Sucre. She is the eldest of three children. Her father, Jorge Emilio Alcocer, was an active member of the Conservative Party and was an admirer of former Colombian senator and ambassador to the United States Álvaro Gómez Hurtado His last name comes from Italy, where his ancestors arrived in the 1930s His mother, Elisabeth García, was a housewife and a fervent devotee of the Catholic faith, has been one of her main supports throughout the years.

When she was a child, she dreamed of being a nun, although that dream would later change with the arrival of her first child, Nicolas, the result of a spontaneous relationship, which would force her to return to her parents' house.

She is the eldest of 3 siblings, in her youth she wanted to be a nun but gave up being one, spending a few years she wanted to be an artist, and later she would enter the university to study law.

Subsequent activities
Alcocer accompanied Petro during his presidential candidacies, and it is said, she was a close adviser to him when he served as mayor of Bogotá. In addition to her political activity, she has dedicated her time to social activism, has undertaken aid programs for children, adolescents and the elderly and has stated that she seeks to give a positive image of Colombia.

She has emphasized the importance of the important role that she will play as first lady, being her unconditional support for her husband, Gustavo Petro.

Alcocer declares herself as an ambassador of Colombian fashion and design.

Role in 2022 presidential campaign

Alcocer had an individual role in the presidential campaign of her husband Gustavo Petro, she always made it clear that her commitment as a spokesperson for the most disadvantaged was outside her.

In June 2022, a series of secretly recorded videos of private meetings of Petro's presidential campaign were leaked, in one of which Alcocer was heard saying that all female journalists slept their way to the top. Alcocer later apologized, saying that the recordings were "taken out of context" and did not represent her ideas.

First Lady of Colombia (2022-present)

After the victory of her husband on the Presidential election on 19 June 2022, Alcocer officially became the 34th woman to hold the distinction of First Lady of the Nation, as wife and companion of the Colombian head of state, Alcocer has assumed this distinction in a responsible way, she is sure that more than a commitment it is an entire obligation that she feels proud to exercise

After her husband's victory, she declared for a local media;

Within a week of assuming her role, Alcocer drew criticism from both her husband's supporters and detractors for adopting a white savior attitude towards the Afro-Colombian community.

Domestic initiatives and activities
Verónica Alcocer has been active in emergency response to the constant rainfall, in the early morning of last Tuesday, November 8, she landed in Cartagena and led a Unified Command Post in which also participated Mayor William Dau the governor of Bolívar, Vicente Blel, the Minister of Labor, Gloria Inés Ramírez, the governor of Atlántico, Elsa Noguera, the director of the Department of Social Prosperity, Cielo Rusinque the Minister of the Interior, Alfonso Prada and the director of the Risk Management Unit, Javier Pava.

Approval ratings, popularity and controversy
Like her husband Alcocer, she has been the target of criticism from her detractors, who on multiple occasions have accused her of being a simple maintenance that seeks to monopolize the functions and obligations of a public office, since the title first lady is a burden. merely protocol and ceremonial, a part of public opinion largely coming from the opposition, have dared to affirm that everything is about a political strategy with a view to a possible future presidential campaign in 2026.

In February 2023, within her extracurricular agenda as first lady and social manager, she joined the celebration of the Carnival of Barranquilla, being the first time that a first lady in office participated in said party, Alcocer had previously been the target of criticism for the celebrations held on the night of August 7 after the presidential inauguration of her husband, where videos were leaked in which she appeared dancing to the rhythm of cumbia, fandango and porro, native sounds of Córdoba and Sucre, native departments of the presidential couple

Fashion and style
On 21 June 2022, Alcocer chose black pants with a blue wool vest. When she voted for her husband, she inspired everything from memes to analysis of what her four years in this position will be like.

On 7 August 2022, for her husband's inauguration ceremony, Alcocer used a design made up of a jumpsuit chosen for the occasion and designed exclusively for the first lady of Colombia, who wears a cape with three jewels on her shoulders. Momposina filigree crafts. silver buttons, cut 'full length'. Palazzo pants in ivory crepe fabric, which has a fine duchess silk lining on it, a detail that did not go unnoticed by the audience was the brooch with the image of the Virgin of the Miraculous, symbol of devotion and faith set with filigree. matching the silver buttons and made in Santa Cruz de Mompox, which brings together the indigenous heritage, all of this made by the designer Virgilio Madinah

Verónica Alcocer seeks to show off the artisans, who are present and that their excellent knowledge is an essential part of Colombia before the world. What they and they have woven and perpetuate in their communities, thanks to the protection and inheritance of their invaluable legacy. Metalero handmade jewelry, bag by designer Adriana Ureta and gift shoes from Norberto and Antonio.

Foreign trips and activities
Verónica has made several international trips on behalf of the country, a fact that has displeased some sectors of the opposition, who criticize these dissipations stating that the constitution does not give this type of measure.

Funeral of the Queen Elizabeth II
After the death of Queen Elizabeth II, Verónica and the Minister of Foreign Álvaro Leyva went to London as representatives of Colombia, which generated displeasure from the opposition, who argued that the first lady was occupying the functions that in her part were appropriate for the vice president, since she was the second in the order of precedence.

Several media and news sources dared to affirm that the relationship between the president and the vice president was distanced and that because of this Alcocer had opted to take her place.

Days later Márquez, expressed that the relationship with the President is the best, and that she herself had refused the possibility of attending the funeral of the Queen Elizabeth II, the vice president said in textual words that when the Minister of Foreign Affairs had proposed her to represent Colombia at the funeral she said she was not interested in attending the funeral of a representative of African oppression and slavery, taking as a reference that Great Britain was one of the most extensive colonial empires that oppressed the African race for many years, Marquez expressed that she does not feel that her place will be replaced and urged the media and the nation to take for granted that she was chosen to represent Afro-Colombians and that if she had attended the funeral she would have felt uncomfortable, because of the history and all that the British Empire represented for the black race. of her nation and to contribute from her position to the construction of peace.

Japan
Following the Queen's funeral on 19 September 2022 Veronica traveled to Japan in the company of the Minister of Foreign Affairs to attend the state funeral of former Japanese Prime Minister Shinzo Abe on September 27, which was attended by representatives from at least 217 countries.

Later on 29 September 2022 Alcocer had the opportunity to meet with Yuko Kishida wife of Japanese Prime Minister Fumio Kishida "Mrs. Kishida expressed her appreciation to Mrs. Alcocer for her visit to Japan and her attendance at the state funeral of former Prime Minister Abe. Ms. Alcocer extended her condolences on his passing."
Kishida and Alcocer exchanged views between the two nations on issues such as cultures, gender equality, among others. They also left on the table the desire to cooperate in order to have a friendly development between the two countries.

Vatican City
On 14 January 2023, he had the opportunity to meet in an audience at the Library of the Apostolic Palace with Pope Francis that lasted 30 minutes, where they discussed issues that concern them related to intrafamily violence, mistreatment of women and towards the children of the country

Alcocer thanked Pope Francis for receiving her and also conveyed the invitation to visit Colombian territory by Gustavo Petro, President of the Republic, in this crucial period for the country. The meeting culminated with an exchange of gifts with the Supreme Pontiff and his request that they offer prayers for the peace of Colombia and for him.

Venezuela
On 31 January, Alcocer had the opportunity to meet with his Venezuelan counterpart, Cilia Flores, with the purpose of strengthening joint work between the two countries. House of Nariño affirmed that they take place within the framework of the reactivation of diplomatic relations, "as gesture of reconciliation and return of diplomatic relations and joint work" The central meeting between Alcocer and Flores had as its main objective "to strengthen joint work between nations, learn about the Venezuelan gang system and its possibility of adapting it in Colombia, as a contribution to the physical and cognitive development of girls, boys and adolescents, as well as promoting the cultural richness that the territory possesses”. In turn, Alcocer had the opportunity to meet with the President of Venezuela, Nicolas Maduro

Notes

References

External links 

1976 births
First ladies of Colombia
Living people
People from Sincelejo
21st-century Colombian women
Gustavo Petro